Marvin Henry Bovee (January 5, 1827May 7, 1888) was an American educator and advocate for the abolition of the death penalty.  He served one year in the Wisconsin State Senate (1853) and authored the act which abolished capital punishment in the state of Wisconsin (1853 Wis. Act 103).  He later wrote a treatise about the immorality of capital punishment and delivered over 1,200 lectures on the issue around the country over the last 30 years of his life.

Biography
Bovee was born in Amsterdam, New York. He moved with his family to Wisconsin in 1843, settling in Mukwonago and later moving to Eagle, Wisconsin. Bovee campaigned around the United States against capital punishment and published a book on the subject entitled Christ and the Gallows; or Reasons for the Abolition of Capital Punishment. He died from melancholia at his home in Whitewater, Wisconsin.

Political career
Bovee was a member of the Senate in 1853. Previously, he had been Chairman of the Board of Supervisors in Eagle. He was a Democrat.

Published works

References

External links
 
 1853 Wisconsin Act 103, An Act to provide for the punishment of murder in the first degree, and to abolish the penalty of death.

People from Amsterdam, New York
People from Mukwonago, Wisconsin
People from Whitewater, Wisconsin
Democratic Party Wisconsin state senators
American anti–death penalty activists
1827 births
1888 deaths
Writers from New York (state)
Writers from Wisconsin
19th-century American politicians
Activists from New York (state)
People from Eagle, Wisconsin